Aranha is a Portuguese surname, meaning spider. Notable people with the name include:

 Graça Aranha (1868–1931), Brazilian writer
 Jermaine Aranha, Canadian drag queen
 José Aranha (born 1951), Brazilian freestyle swimmer
 Osvaldo Aranha (1894–1960), Brazilian politician, diplomat and statesman
 Ray Aranha (1939–2011), American actor, playwright, and stage director
 Aranha (footballer) (born 1980), Brazilian footballer

Portuguese-language surnames